Pender Harbour Water Aerodrome  is located adjacent to Pender Harbour, British Columbia, Canada.

References

Seaplane bases in British Columbia
Sunshine Coast Regional District
Registered aerodromes in British Columbia